State Highway 72 (SH 72) is a Texas state highway that runs approximately  from near Fowlerton to Cuero in South Texas.

Route description
SH 72 begins in far western McMullen County, near the La Salle County line, at an intersection with  SH 97 north of Fowlerton. The highway has no major intersections until it intersects  SH 16 north of Tilden. The two routes run concurrently into Tilden, where SH 72 resumes its eastward path, passing south of Choke Canyon Reservoir and State Park before entering Live Oak County. The highway enters Three Rivers, where it intersects and runs concurrently with  US 281 through the city center. After separating from US 281, SH 72 takes a more northeasterly trajectory for the remainder of its journey. After crossing  I-37 at the freeway's exit #69, it continues through rural Live Oak County and briefly passes through Bee County before entering Karnes County. In Kenedy, SH 72 intersects  US 181 and passes through the city's downtown along Main Street; SH 72's only business route is also in this city. To the east of the city, SH 72 intersects  SH 239 and passes through Runge before entering DeWitt County. The highway passes through Yorktown along that city's Main Street, intersecting  SH 119. SH 72 intersects  US 87 to the west of Cuero before it turns to the east and into the city. SH 72 ends at  Alt. US 77 / US 87 / US 183 on the south side of Cuero.

History
SH 72 was originally proposed on August 21, 1923 from Cuero to Carmine, absorbing previously designated SH 3B. On March 17, 1924, it extended southwest to Yorktown. On December 21, 1926, it extended to Karnes City. On February 21, 1928, its south end was rerouted to Kenedy. On March 3, 1931, SH 72 Spur to Sweet Home was added, but was not part of the state highway system (it was added to the state highway system on March 16, 1937). On May 15, 1934, SH 72 Bypass was designated in Yoakum. On November 24, 1936, its route had been readjusted, with the section north of Cuero transferred to US 77/SH 44 and SH 128. On November 16, 1937, it extended to Three Rivers. On September 26, 1939, it extended west to Cotulla, replacing part of SH 202, and everything north of Cuero was cancelled (as it was part of US 77). SH 72 Spur and SH 72 Bypass were renumbered Spur 27 (Sweet Home) and Loop 51 (Yoakum). On June 23, 1942, the section from Fowlerton to Three Rivers was either cancelled or transferred to Farm to Market Road 63. On July 31, 1942, the section from Fowlerton to Cotulla was transferred to SH 97. On December 15, 1960, the section from Fowlerton to Three Rivers was transferred back to SH 72, replacing FM 63. On March 2, 1981, the section between Three Rivers and Tilden was relocated around the then-proposed Choke Canyon Reservoir, as the old route would be inundated by the Choke Canyon Reservoir. The section from the junction with  US 87 in Cuero into the city was designated Farm to Market Road 3402 in 1977; this route was extended to the west to US 87 in 1983. FM 3402 was combined with SH 72 on March 31, 1994, completing the current route.

SH 72 has seen increased traffic due to oil and gas exploration of the Eagle Ford Formation; recent counts have indicated that traffic on SH 72 exceeds that on US 87 around Cuero. As a result, TxDOT is considering the addition of shoulders to SH 72 in western DeWitt County.

Business route

SH 72 has one business route, Business SH 72-B in Kenedy, which is a former alignment of the state highway along Karnes Street through that city. The route was designated as Spur 542 on April 20, 1982, when SH 72 was rerouted to use Main Street. The route was changed to Business SH 72-B on June 21, 1990. The western end of the business route is at Bus. US 181, which was renumbered from Spur 259 the same day.

Major intersections

Notes

References

External links
Texas State Highway 72 at AARoads

072
Transportation in DeWitt County, Texas
Transportation in Karnes County, Texas
Transportation in Bee County, Texas
Transportation in Live Oak County, Texas
Transportation in McMullen County, Texas